Madras on Rainy Days is a novel written by Samina Ali and published in 2004.

Overview

The books explores the life of Layla, a second generation Indian-American Muslim. Layla, torn between clashing identities, agrees to her parents' wish for her to leave America and submit to an arranged marriage, Layla enters into the closed world of tradition and ritual as the wedding preparations get underway in Hyderabad.

Awards and recognition

In 2004, Madras on Rainy Days received the Rona Jaffe Foundation Award in Fiction. The book also won the PEN/Hemingway Foundation Award in 2005, and was awarded the Prix Premier Roman Étranger 2005 Award in France.

In July 2004, the book was chosen as a best debut novel of the year by Poets & Writers magazine. The magazine featured Samina on the cover of its July/August 2004 issue.

References

External links
 GroundbreakHers official website
 Read the novel here

2004 Indian novels
2004 American novels
Books by Samina Ali
Novels set in India
2004 debut novels